Schonlau is a surname. Notable people with this name include:

Matthias Schonlau (born 1967), German statistician and actuarial scientist
Ree Schonlau (born 1946), American artist, arts administrator, and arts consultant
Sebastian Schonlau (born 1994), German footballer